Black Belt Karate Kick mostly known as Enter the Invincible Hero is 1977 Bruceploitation and drama martial art movie starring notorious Bruce Lee imitator Dragon Lee and spin kick master Casanova Wong.

Plot
Ti-Meng (Dragon Lee) the young man who is looking for the job offers his services for protection outfit. When the money from the village has stolen from the bandits Meng was compensate and everyone blamed him for losing all the money. However it turns out that all the money was stolen from the Pang (Casanova Wong) who is also Ti-Meng's old school friend. Ti-Meng finds out the whole situation and decided to get all the money back from Pang. at first pang humiliates and defeats Ti-Meng. at the end fight Ti-meng defeats and kills pang with his new art

Cast
Dragon Lee as Ti-Meng
Casanova Wong as Pang
Martin Chui Man Fooi as Wu Tin
Lee Ye Min as Mr.Lee
Kim Young Suk as Pang's gang
Danny Tsui as Pang's gang
Chen Shao Lung Killer of Pang's father (Archive footage from THE MAGNIFICENT)
Lee Hoi Sang (Intro, archive footage from ENTER THREE DRAGONS)
Seo Jeong Ah

Reception
In webpage Oocities the movie was fairly receive pretty well. J. Doyle Walls DVD talk mentioned that movie is fairly decent as a Bruceploitation 
standard

Production
Unlike usual Godfrey Ho movie the movie did not use that much cut and paste technique. However some of the archive footage from Enter Three Dragons and The Magnificent have been used in the movie.

References

1977 films
1970s martial arts films
1970s action films
Bruceploitation films
South Korean multilingual films
Hong Kong multilingual films
Hong Kong martial arts films
South Korean martial arts films
1970s Hong Kong films
1980s Hong Kong films